White Mountains National Recreation Area is a national recreation area in the U.S. state of Alaska.  It is located to the north of Fairbanks between the Elliott Highway and the Steese Highway in the White Mountains, with about  within its boundaries. It is managed by the U.S. Bureau of Land Management as part of the National Landscape Conservation System. It is adjacent to Steese National Conservation Area. Beaver Creek flows through the area and is listed as a wild and scenic river.

See also
Wickersham Dome

References

National Recreation Areas of the United States
Protected areas of Yukon–Koyukuk Census Area, Alaska
Units of the National Landscape Conservation System